Cake or Death may refer to:

 "Cake or Death", a skit from Dress to Kill (1998), by Eddie Izzard
 Cake or Death (Cake or Death album), 2006
 Cake or Death (Lee Hazlewood album), 2006